Xyletobius fraternus is a species of beetle in the family Ptinidae.

Subspecies
These two subspecies belong to the species Xyletobius fraternus:
 Xyletobius fraternus fraternus Perkins, 1910
 Xyletobius fraternus laetior Perkins, 1910

References

Further reading

 
 
 
 

Ptinidae
Beetles described in 1910